Jane Elizabeth Ann Masséglia  is an ancient historian and Lecturer in Ancient History at the University of Leicester.

Biography
Masséglia studied for a first degree in Literae humaniores at Oxford University before gaining a PGCE and teaching Latin, Greek, and Classical Civilisations. She gained her PhD from Lincoln College, Oxford. She is the Senior Scientist for the European Research Council project 'LatinNow'. She was elected as a fellow of the Society of Antiquaries of London on 13 February 2020.

Select publications
Anderson, J.E.A. 2007. "Two sides to every story: a tale of love and hate on a Lakonian stele", Sparta: Journal of Spartan and Ancient Greek History 3.2, pp23–28.
Masséglia, J. 2012. "Reasons to be Cheerful? The Drunken Old Woman of Munich and Rome" in A. Chaniotis (ed.), Unveiling Emotions: Sources and Methods for the Study of Emotions in the Greek World. Stuttgart, HABES. 413–440.
Masséglia, J. (with Ahmet Ertug and R.R.R. Smith) 2014 Ancient Theaters of Anatolia. Istanbul.
Masséglia, J. 2015. Body Language in Hellenistic Art and Society (Oxford Studies in Ancient Culture and Representation). Oxford, Oxford University Press.
Masséglia, J. (ed) 2016. The Philae Obelisk (The Classics Conclave).
Masséglia, J. 2016. "Rome’s Walking Dead: Resurrecting a Roman funeral at the Ashmolean Museum", Journal of Classics Teaching

References

External links
A series of Podcasts featuring Jane Masséglia from the University of Oxford

Living people
Year of birth missing (living people)
Fellows of the Society of Antiquaries of London
Alumni of Lincoln College, Oxford
Women classical scholars
Historians of antiquity
Academics of the University of Leicester